Sušice is a town in Klatovy District in the Plzeň Region of the Czech Republic. It has about 11,000 inhabitants. The historic town centre is well preserved and is protected by law as an urban monument zone.

Administrative parts
Sušice is made up of 17 town parts and villages: Sušice I–III, Albrechtice, Červené Dvorce, Chmelná, Divišov, Dolní Staňkov, Humpolec, Milčice, Nuzerov, Páteček, Rok, Stráž, Volšovy, Vrabcov and Záluží.

Etymology
The name Sušice is derived from the Czech verb sušit, i.e. "dry". At the time of its establishment, it was a place where gold panners dried the gold sand after washing.

Geography
It lies in the Bohemian Forest Foothills. The Otava River flows through the town.

Climate

History
Sušice originated as a settlement near the Otava River, a gold-mining area. The settlement was probably founded around 790, however the first written mention is from 1233. In the 12th century, the area was owned by the Bavarian Counts of Bogen. It was re-connected to Bohemia by King Ottokar II in the 13th century and after 1260 it became a royal fortified town.

During the Hussite Wars (1419–1434), Sušice was a Hussite town. The town's major economic growth occurred in the 16th century, when the town profited from the salt, grain and malt trade with neighbouring Bavaria. In the 17th and 18th centuries, Sušice suffered from wars, fires and the Counter-Reformation. The most devastating was the fire of 1707, which destroyed most of the town. In the 19th century, new prosperity came. The production of phosphorus matches started here and made Sušice famous all over the world. The leather industry also developed in the town, and at the end of the 19th century, the mining and processing of limestone was started.

Until 1918, Sušice – Schüttenhoffen was part of the Austrian monarchy (Austrian side after the compromise of 1867). The town was an administrative seat of the district of the same name, one of the 94 Bezirkshauptmannschaften in Bohemia.

Jewish community
The first written mention of Jews in Sušice is from 1562. The number of Jews in Sušice gradually increased and reached its peak in 1860, when 300 lived here. A pogrom occurred in 1866, then the population decreased and in 1930 only 112 Jews lived in Sušice. They had a reserved part of the town for living, which was accessible only from the town walls (today's Vodní, formerly Židovská  (i.e. "Jewish") street).

Three synagogues were located in Sušice. The first was a wooden prayer house, which burned down in 1707. A new synagogue was built on its site, which served until 1923, when it also burned down. A third synagogue was in operation from 1859, which served its purpose until the World War II. After the war, it became the property of the town and was demolished in 1963.

The old Jewish cemetery was established in 1626, the last burial took place there in 1873. After its capacity was no longer sufficient, a new cemetery was founded in 1873, where the last burial took place in 1946.

Demographics

Economy

Sušice was known for the production of matches under the SOLO brand. The factory was founded by Vojtěch Scheinost in 1839 and the production was financed by entrepreneur Bernard Fürth. The production has continued until 2008, when it ended due to financial problems. The production was moved to India and the company was transformed into a trading company in related goods (matches, lighters, etc.).

Transport
Sušice is located on the regional railway line leading from Klatovy to Horažďovice.

Sights

The Bohemian Forest Museum is located in a Gothic house on the corner of the square. It focuses on the history of Sušice and the local production of matches.

The Church of Saint Wenceslaus was built in the mid-14th century. Its southern wall was formed by the town wall. During the fire in 1707, the chruch was damaged and lost its two towers. It was reconstructed in the Baroque style and a new small tower was built. In 1884–1885, pseudo-Gothic modifications were made.

The Capuchin monastery with the Church of Saint Felix of Cantalice was founded by Emperor Ferdinand III. The church was built in 1651–1655 and the monastery building was constructed in 1665–1686. It used to be an important pilgrimage site. With the exception of the years 1950–1992, the monastery still serves the Capuchins.

The Church of the Assumption of the Virgin Mary is probably part of a larger unfinished Gothic church from the 14th century. The cemetery church was rebuilt to its current form after the fire in 1591.

The Chapel of the Guardian Angel on Stráž hill on the outskirts of Sušice is a significant landmark of the town. It was built in the early Baroque style in 1682–1683. It is a pilgrimage site and the way to it is lined with the Stations of the Cross.

The Jewish community is commemorated by two Jewish cemeteries. The Old Cemetery is one of the oldest Jewish cemeteries in Bohemia. The oldest preserved tombstone dates from 1708.

The hill was a sacred place for the original Slavic tribes, and a burial ground was discovered at its foot. The stone observation tower was built in 1934, after the original tower from 1900 burned down.

Notable people
Maximilian Pirner (1853–1924), painter
Karl Koller (1857–1944), Austrian ophthalmologist
František Salzer (1902–1974), theatre director and actor
Břetislav Pojar (1923–2012), puppeteer, animator and film director
Petr Vaníček (born 1935), Czech-Canadian geodesist
Marie Fikáčková (1936–1961), serial killer
Jiří Maštálka (born 1956), politician
Tomáš Pekhart (born 1989), footballer

Twin towns – sister cities

Sušice is a member of the Douzelage, a town twinning association of towns across the European Union. This active town twinning began in 1991, and there are now regular events resulting from this membership, such as festivals, or a produce market presenting goods from the countries of the twin towns. Its members are:

 Agros, Cyprus
 Altea, Spain
 Asikkala, Finland
 Bad Kötzting, Germany
 Bellagio, Italy
 Bundoran, Ireland
 Chojna, Poland
 Granville, France
 Holstebro, Denmark
 Houffalize, Belgium
 Judenburg, Austria
 Kőszeg, Hungary
 Marsaskala, Malta
 Meerssen, Netherlands
 Niederanven, Luxembourg
 Oxelösund, Sweden
 Preveza, Greece
 Rokiškis, Lithuania
 Rovinj, Croatia
 Sesimbra, Portugal
 Sherborne, England, United Kingdom
 Sigulda, Latvia
 Siret, Romania
 Škofja Loka, Slovenia
 Tryavna, Bulgaria
 Türi, Estonia
 Zvolen, Slovakia

Sušice also has two other twin towns:

 Uetendorf, Switzerland
 Wenzenbach, Germany

Gallery

References

External links

Cities and towns in the Czech Republic
Populated places in Klatovy District
Prácheňsko